Hans Jørgen Christensen (born 25 November 1943) is a Danish former footballer who played as a defender for Esbjerg fB. He made five appearances for the Denmark national team from 1968 to 1969.

References

External links
 
 

1943 births
Living people
People from Fredericia
Danish men's footballers
Association football defenders
Denmark international footballers
Esbjerg fB players
Sportspeople from the Region of Southern Denmark